The Roman Catholic Archdiocese of Tijuana is  a Metropolitan Archdiocese in Mexico. It is based in the city of Tijuana, Baja California, and the province has the suffragan dioceses of Ensenada, La Paz en la Baja California Sur, and Mexicali.

Bishops

Ordinaries
Ramón María de San José Moreno y Castañeda, O. Carm. (1873–1879). appointed Bishop of Chiapas (Ciudad Real de Chiapas)
Buenaventura del Purísimo Corazón de María Portillo y Tejeda, O.F.M. (1880–1882), appointed Bishop of Chilapa, Guerrero
Silvino Ramírez y Cuera (1921–1922) 
Alfredo Galindo Mendoza, M.Sp.S. (1948–1970) 
Juan Jesús Posadas Ocampo (1970–1982), appointed Bishop of Cuernavaca, Morelos; future Cardinal
Emilio Carlos Berlie Belaunzarán (1983–1995), appointed Archbishop of Yucatán
Rafael Romo Muñoz (1996–2016)
Francisco Moreno Barrón (2016–present)

Other priests of this diocese who became bishops
Francisco Javier Chavolla Ramos, appointed Bishop of Matamoros, Tamaulipas in 1991
Ramón Castro Castro, appointed Auxiliary Bishop of Yucatán in 2004

See also
List of Roman Catholic archdioceses in México

External links and references

Official Website of the Archdiocese: http://www.iglesiatijuana.org/

Roman Catholic dioceses in Mexico
Tijuana, Roman Catholic Archdiocese of
A
Religious organizations established in 1874
Roman Catholic dioceses and prelatures established in the 19th century
1874 establishments in Mexico